Huangcai Town is a rural town in Ningxiang City, Hunan Province, China. It is known for the bronze culture of the Shang culture at Laoliangcang Town.

Administrative division
The town is divided into 16 villages and one community: 
 Qingyang Community
 Huangcai
 Yueshan
 Longquan
 Shaping
 Ningfeng
 Jingchong
 Juanshui
 Songxi
 Xinqiao
 Shishan
 Shilongdong
 Cuiping
 Tanheli
 Weibin
 Shishi'an
 Duanxi Village

Geography

Huangcai Reservoir is the largest reservoir in Ningxiang, it is located in the town.

Wei River is known as "Mother River", a tributary of the Xiang River, it flows through the town.

Economy
The region abounds with coal, manganese and uranium.

Capsicum annuum is important to the economy.

Education
There is one senior high school located with the town limits: Ningxiang Third Senior High School.

Culture
Huaguxi is the most influence local theater.

Transport
The County Road X211 travels east to west through the town.

The County Road X104 passes across the town east to southwest.

Notable people
Gan Siqi, a general in the People's Liberation Army.

References

External links

Divisions of Ningxiang
Ningxiang